The 2009 Stony Brook Seawolves football team represented Stony Brook University as a member of the Big South Conference during the 2009 NCAA Division I FCS football season. The team was led by fourth-year head coach Chuck Priore and played it home games at Kenneth P. LaValle Stadium at Stony Brook, New York. The Seawolves compiled an overall record of 6–5 with a mark of 5–1 in conference place, sharing the Big South title with Liberty. This was Stony Brook's first Big South championship.

Schedule

References

Stony Brook
Stony Brook Seawolves football seasons
Big South Conference football champion seasons
Stony Brook Seawolves football